Cyril Ross Grayson Jr. (born December 5, 1993) is an American football wide receiver who is a free agent. He did not play college football, but was an All-American track sprinter at LSU.

Early and personal life
Grayson has three sisters and two brothers. His parents are a plant worker and a financial advisor. Grayson attended Archbishop Rummel High School.

College career
Grayson attended Louisiana State University (LSU), majoring in kinesiology, where he was an All-American track sprinter. He did not play football in college because the NCAA prohibited athletes who were on scholarship for a minor sport like track from playing major sports; such a rule was created to prevent football teams from circumventing their scholarship limit by allocating extra players to other sports. He gave up his track scholarship in order to undertake football training.

Professional career

Seattle Seahawks
Grayson tried out for the CFL in January 2017. After not playing college football, he attended a pro day organized by LSU, and he signed with the Seattle Seahawks as an undrafted free agent on April 10, 2017. He was waived on September 2, 2017 and was signed to the practice squad the next day, only to be released five days later.

Indianapolis Colts
On September 19, 2017, Grayson was signed to the Indianapolis Colts practice squad. He was released on October 17, 2017.

Seattle Seahawks (second stint)
On December 5, 2017, Grayson was signed to the Seattle Seahawks practice squad. He signed a reserve/future contract on January 2, 2018. He was waived on September 1, 2018.

Houston Texans
On October 1, 2018, Grayson was signed to the Houston Texans practice squad. He was released on October 29, 2018.

Chicago Bears
On November 27, 2018, Grayson was signed to the Chicago Bears practice squad. He signed a reserve/future contract on January 8, 2019. He was waived on May 2, 2019.

New Orleans Saints
On May 13, 2019, Grayson was signed by the New Orleans Saints. He was waived on August 30, 2019.

Dallas Cowboys
On December 11, 2019, Grayson was signed to the Dallas Cowboys practice squad.

Tampa Bay Buccaneers
On December 17, 2019, Grayson was signed by the Tampa Bay Buccaneers off the Cowboys practice squad. He recorded his first professional catch on a three-yard reception against the Atlanta Falcons in Week 17. Grayson was waived by the Buccaneers during final roster cuts on September 5, 2020, and was signed to the practice squad the following day. He was elevated to the active roster on September 12 and 19 for the team's weeks 1 and 2 games against the New Orleans Saints and Carolina Panthers, and reverted to the practice squad after each game. He was promoted to the active roster on October 6. He was waived on November 3, and re-signed to the practice squad two days later. He was placed on the practice squad/COVID-19 list by the team on November 14, 2020, and restored to the practice squad on November 19. He was placed on the practice squad/injured list on December 21, 2020, and restored to the practice squad on January 29, 2021. Grayson won his first Super Bowl with the Buccaneers on February 7, 2021, defeating the Kansas City Chiefs 31–9, in Super Bowl LV. On February 9, 2021, Grayson re-signed with the Buccaneers.

On August 31, 2021, Grayson was waived by the Buccaneers and re-signed to the practice squad the next day. On October 31, 2021, Grayson caught his first touchdown pass on a 50-yard pass from Tom Brady against the New Orleans Saints. On January 2, 2022, Grayson caught six receptions for 81 yards and a game winning touchdown with 15 seconds left against the New York Jets. Grayson filled in for Antonio Brown on the game winning play, who had previously left the game during the third quarter. He was then signed to the active roster on January 8.

On August 25, 2022, Grayson was waived by the Buccaneers.

Cleveland Browns
On November 7, 2022, Grayson was signed to the Cleveland Browns practice squad. He was waived on November 15, 2022.

References

External links
Tampa Bay Buccaneers bio
LSU Tigers bio

1993 births
Living people
American football wide receivers
LSU Tigers track and field athletes
Seattle Seahawks players
Indianapolis Colts players
Houston Texans players
Chicago Bears players
New Orleans Saints players
People from Kenner, Louisiana
Players of American football from Louisiana
Dallas Cowboys players
Tampa Bay Buccaneers players
Track and field athletes from Louisiana
Cleveland Browns players